Vittoria Bussi (born 19 March 1987) is an Italian professional racing cyclist. She holds a DPhil in pure mathematics from the University of Oxford for a 2014 thesis entitled Derived symplectic structures in generalized Donaldson–Thomas theory and categorification.

In September 2018, she set a new UCI Women's hour record, riding  at the Aguascalientes Bicentenary Velodrome, Aguascalientes, Mexico, beating the previous record set by Evelyn Stevens in 2016 by 27 metres. It was Bussi's third attempt at the record, having fallen short of Stevens' performance in Aguascalientes in October 2017 by 404 metres and having abandoned a second attempt after 40 minutes the day before her record-breaking ride.

Major results
2020
 3rd  Mixed team relay, UEC European Road Championships

References

External links

1987 births
Living people
Italian female cyclists
Cyclists from Rome
Alumni of the University of Oxford
Sapienza University of Rome alumni
21st-century Italian women